The FIA Global Pathway from Karting to Formula One is a program developed by the Fédération Internationale de l'Automobile (FIA), the international sanctioning body for motorsports that is designed to assist racing drivers progress from karting to Formula One. The program was first developed in 2014 with the creation of the Formula 4 category, and follows a tiered structure, with drivers racing in increasingly-powerful cars. The Global Pathway represents the consolidation of feeder series to create a more linear approach to progressing into Formula One.

Eligible series

Formula 4

Formula 4 is the first stage of the Global Pathway, for drivers fifteen years of age and older. Formula 4 is structured as a "national" championship, with each series contained within a single geographical area. Despite the "national" classification, Formula 4 championships may encompass several countries. Each Formula 4 championship uses chassis and engines built to a single specification so that drivers can compete in multiple championships without having to adjust to a different car.

Formula Regional

The second stage of the Global Pathway is Regional Formula 3, also known as Formula Regional, which puts drivers in cars that are progressively more powerful than those used in Formula 4. The series is classified as a "regional" championship. As of 2023, there are six regional series: Formula Regional Americas Championship, Formula Regional European Championship by Alpine, Formula Regional Japanese Championship, Formula Regional Indian Championship, Formula Regional Middle East Championship and Formula Regional Oceania Championship

Formula 3
The only "international" series of Formula 3 are the FIA Formula 3 Championship and the FIA Formula 3 World Cup, a one-event competition that traditionally takes place during the Macau Grand Prix. It started in 2019.

Formula 2
Formula 2 is the final intermediary stage of the Global Pathway. The series is an "international" championship for drivers seventeen to eighteen years old. Drivers are not  required to participate in Formula 2 to compete in Formula One, as success in Formula 3 contributes to a driver's FIA Super Licence; however, of the series which are recognised as contributing to a Super Licence, Formula 2 has the greatest weight.

Formula 1
Formula One represents the top tier of the Global Pathway, with the series recognised by the FIA as the premier class of open-wheel motorsport.

Other series
Other established open-wheel series, such as Euroformula Open Championship, are not considered to be a part of the Global Pathway, but will still contribute to a driver's Super Licence.

Comparison

References

Fédération Internationale de l'Automobile
Sports organizations established in 2014
Racing schools